The Kongoro lampeye (Lacustricola kongoranensis) is a species of fish in the family Poeciliidae. It is endemic to Tanzania.  Its natural habitats are rivers and intermittent rivers.

References

Kongoro lampeye
Endemic freshwater fish of Tanzania
Kongoro lampeye
Taxonomy articles created by Polbot
Taxobox binomials not recognized by IUCN